The Armoured Multi Purpose Vehicle (AMPV) is a well-protected light armoured 4×4 vehicle that has been developed as a joint venture between Germany's Rheinmetall MAN Military Vehicles (RMMV) and Krauss-Maffei Wegmann (KMW). It was developed for the German Army's Protected Command and Function (GFF) Group 2 requirement.

The overall design of the AMPV has moved forward from the Cold War thinking of previous generation wheeled armoured vehicles, and throughout it has been optimised for current asymmetric conflict operations. According to the manufacturer, right from the outset, purely military requirements dictated AMPV's design. In the process, the development team took systematic account of experience gained during the ISAF mission in Afghanistan and other operations worldwide. As a result, the AMPV is now the best-protected vehicle in its class anywhere.

History
Development of the AMPV began in 2007, and a full-scale mockup was shown for the first time at Eurosatory 2008. The first fully functional prototype was shown for the first time in 2009.

The German Army purchased the AMPV for extensive trials, these completed late in 2011.

The AMPV was conceived as a family of vehicles that would meet a wide range of user requirements, and have gross vehicle weight ratings (GVWR) of between 5.3-tonnes (Type 1a & 1b) and 9.2-tonnes (Type 2a & 2b). Since conception, requirements have evolved and only Type 2 variants have been built, these now having a maximum permissible GVWR of 10.1-tonnes.

The AMPV has been demonstrated overseas and during 2010 an example underwent a series of high altitude trials in Chile. These included 2800 km at heights up to 4800 m above sea level. By 2015 the AMPV had completed approaching 30,000 test km in all conditions.

An AMPV optimised for special forces use was demonstrated in Poland during September 2015, this targeted at Poland's Pegaz project for special forces vehicles. This example featured a remotely operated weapon station made by Polish defence contractor Tarnow, armed with a heavy machine gun.

Description
The AMPV was designed by RMMV and KMW, with body styling by Porsche Design Studio. Unlike many vehicles of similar size/capacity, the AMPV is not based on a commercial chassis, but has been designed and built specifically to meet military requirements.

The design of the AMPV is based around a central armoured crew cell/citadel, this having a multi-layered floor for enhanced mine blast protection. The self-supporting armoured steel citadel accepts add-on passive composite armour modules which can be changed as new armour technology evolves or the threat level changes. Crew survivability is enhanced by the installation of de-coupled seats. During trials, instrumented dummy crew members survived the blast from a 100 kg improvised explosive device (IED) that was exploded five metres from the AMPV citadel. AMPV also features built-in impact protection.

The AMPV also features air-conditioning and a full NBC filtration and over-pressure system.

The front power pack and rear cargo area are not protected and mount to sub-frames, the AMPV not having a conventional chassis. The rear cargo area can be configured to suit user requirements and features 2220 litres of usable stowage space. AMPV can tow a trailer of up to 3500 kg in weight.

Motive power is provided by a Steyr Motors M16 SCI diesel engine that has the ability to operate for extended periods on high sulphur, low quality and military-specific fuels such as F34/JP-8. Twin 150A alternators provide electrical power for engine and associated systems, radios/communications equipment, and ancillaries such a remote weapon station.

The optional remote weapon station can be fitted with a machine gun (up to 12.7 mm) or a 40 mm automatic grenade launcher. A protected ringmount with similar armament options can also be fitted. If necessary, the protection level can be enhanced still further by integrating additional assemblies. These include Rheinmetall's Acoustic Sniper Localisation System (ASLS) and Situational Awareness System (SAS), assuring 360° monitoring of the vehicle's surroundings. Rheinmetall's Rapid Obscurant System (ROSY) system for generating a smoke screen is an option. Unlike conventional smoke/obscurant systems, ROSY creates an instantaneous, extensive, multispectral interruption of the line of sight, including a dynamic wall of smoke/obscurant that provides moving objects with sustained protection and concealment. The under-development Active Protective System (APS) will be a further option.

Gearbox is a fully automatic ZF unit, this coupled to a two-speed transfer case. The planetary hub-reduction drive axles have disc brakes and feature a central tire inflation system (CTIS) and anti-lock brakes (ABS). Tyres are 385/80R 20, wheels featuring runflat inserts as standard.

Suspension is fully independent, each wheel featuring twin coil-over shock-absorbers supplemented by hydraulic bump stops. Suspension stroke is up to +/-150mm.

The drivetrain features Steyr's Automatic Drivetrain Management (ADM). ADM automatically controls and monitors longitudinal and cross-axle differential locks, thereby reducing strain on the driver, with full drivetrain lock-up possible for maximum traction. RMMV literature states ADM offers advantages that include shorter driver training, longer service and maintenance intervals, prevention of damage by driver error or mistake, and longer tyre life.

Performance capabilities include the ability to climb >70% grade, traverse >40% sideslope, surmount a 400mm vertical step, cross a 750 mm wide ditch, and ford 850 mm of water without preparation. Ground clearance is 350 mm, and turning circle is 15 m. AMPV is able to operate at temperatures ranging from -46 °C to +55 °C.

Options can include a fire suppression system, a 360 degree camera system, a GPS system, and a front- or rear-mounting self-recovery winch.

The AMPV can be transported by standard rail cars, or in the air by C-130 Hercules aircraft or as an underslung load by Boeing CH-47 Chinook helicopter.

Gallery

See also
 RMMV Survivor R - Wheeled armoured vehicle offered by RMMV
 Rheinmetall YAK - Wheeled armoured vehicle offered by RMMV
 Boxer - Wheeled armoured vehicle offered by RMMV in a JV with KMW
 Rheinmetall MAN Military Vehicles - JV of MAN and Rheinmetall for wheeled vehicles
 MAN LX and FX ranges of tactical trucks - Tactical truck offered by RMMV
 MAN SX - Tactical truck offered by RMMV
 List of modern equipment of the German Army
 Mowag Eagle
 Oshkosh L-ATV
 Oshkosh M-ATV
 Dozor-B
 Pindad Komodo
 VEPR

References

Bibliography
 AMPV Type 2A military brochure (KMW/RMMV) (2010)
 Jane's Armour & Artillery 2011/2012   Jane’s Land Warfare Platforms: Armoured Fighting Vehicles
 Jane's Armour & Artillery 2009/2010   Jane’s Land Warfare Platforms: Armoured Fighting Vehicles
 AMPV 4x4 White Paper (KMW/RMMV) (Industry presentation 2015)

External links

 Presentation of the AMPV vehicle, dedicated for Polish Special Forces
 Rheinmetall AMPV  (YouTube)
 New Made in German Next Generation 4x4 Armored AMPV
 AMPV (RMMV AMPV)
 AMPV (KMW AMPV page)
 MSPO 2015 (AMPV) (Militechmag.com)

Post–Cold War military vehicles of Germany
Rheinmetall
Off-road vehicles
Military transport
Military light utility vehicles
Wheeled reconnaissance vehicles